Uncial 067 (in the Gregory-Aland numbering), ε 2 (Soden), is a Greek uncial manuscript of the New Testament, dated paleographically to the 6th century.

Description 
The codex contains a small part of the Matthew 14; Mark 9, 14, on 6 parchment leaves (20 cm by 15.5 cm). The text is written in two columns per page, 24 lines per page. It is a palimpsest, the upper text was written in the 10th century it contains Georgian calendar. 

The text of this codex contains:

Matthew 14:13-16.19-23; 24:37-25:1.32-45; 26:31-45; Mark 9:14-22; 14:58-70. 

The Greek text of this codex is mixed, with a strong element of the Byzantine text-type. Aland placed it in Category III.

History 

Currently the manuscript is dated by the INTF to the 6th century.

Probably it was brought from Sinai. It was examined by Eduard de Muralt and Kurt Treu.

It is currently housed at the Russian National Library (Suppl. Gr. 6 III, fol. 8-9) in Saint Petersburg.

See also 
 List of New Testament uncials
 Biblical manuscript
 Textual criticism
 Uncial 0321
 Uncial 0322

References

Further reading 

 Constantin von Tischendorf, Monumenta sacra et profana I (Leipzig: 1846), pp. XIII-XIX, 1-48.
 Eduard de Muralt, Catalogue des manuscrits grecs de la Bibliothèque Impériale publique (Petersburg 1864), pp. 4–5.
 Kurt Treu, Die Griechischen Handschriften des Neuen Testaments in der USSR; eine systematische Auswertung des Texthandschriften in Leningrad, Moskau, Kiev, Odessa, Tbilisi und Erevan, T & U 91 (Berlin: 1966), pp. 22-24.

External links 
 Uncial 067 at the Leuven Database of Ancient Books

Palimpsests
Greek New Testament uncials
6th-century biblical manuscripts
National Library of Russia collection